Chuvalkipovo (Sıwalkip) is a rural locality (a selo) and the administrative centre of Chuvalkipovsky Selsoviet, Chishminsky District, Bashkortostan, Russia. The population was 451 as of 2010. There are 7 streets.

Geography 
Chuvalkipovo is located 36 km south of Chishmy (the district's administrative centre) by road. Abrayevo is the nearest rural locality.

References 

Rural localities in Chishminsky District